Bluebird Gap [elevation: ] is a gap in Walker County, in the U.S. state of Georgia.

Bluebird Gap was named for Blue Bird, a local Native American.

References

Landforms of Walker County, Georgia
Valleys of Georgia (U.S. state)